This is an incomplete list of Statutory Rules of Northern Ireland in 2007.

1-100

 Rates (Industrial Hereditaments) (Amendment) Order (Northern Ireland) 2007 (S.R. 2007 No. 1)
 Rates (Payment by Owners by Agreement) (Amendment) Order (Northern Ireland) 2007 (S.R. 2007 No. 2)
 Registration of Deeds (Fees) Order (Northern Ireland) 2007 (S.R. 2007 No. 3)
 Registration (Amendment) Rules (Northern Ireland) 2007 (S.R. 2007 No. 4)
 Registration of Deeds (Amendment) Regulations (Northern Ireland) 2007 (S.R. 2007 No. 5)
 Land Registry (Fees) Order (Northern Ireland) 2007 (S.R. 2007 No. 6)
 Motor Vehicles (Wearing of Seat Belts) (Amendment) Regulations (Northern Ireland) 2007 (S.R. 2007 No. 7)
 Motor Vehicles (Wearing of Seat Belts) (Amendment No. 2) Regulations (Northern Ireland) 2007 (S.R. 2007 No. 8)
 Motor Vehicles (Wearing of Seat Belts by Children in Front Seats) (Amendment) Regulations (Northern Ireland) 2007 (S.R. 2007 No. 9)
 Planning (Trees) (Amendment) Regulations (Northern Ireland) 2007 (S.R. 2007 No. 10)
 Health and Personal Social Services (Joint Committee for Commissioning) Order (Northern Ireland) 2007 (S.R. 2007 No. 14)
 Motor Vehicles (Construction and Use) (Amendment) Regulations (Northern Ireland) 2007 (S.R. 2007 No. 15)
 Food Hygiene (Amendment) Regulations (Northern Ireland) 2007 (S.R. 2007 No. 16)
 Smoke Control Areas (Authorised Fuels) (Amendment) Regulations (Northern Ireland) 2007 (S.R. 2007 No. 17)
 Meat (Official Controls Charges) (Amendment) Regulations (Northern Ireland) 2007 (S.R. 2007 No. 18)
 Foyle Area and Carlingford Area (Licensing of Fishing Engines) (Amendment) Regulations 2007 (S.R. 2007 No. 19)
 Non-Domestic Rating (Hardship Relief) Regulations (Northern Ireland) 2007 (S.R. 2007 No. 20)
 Plant Health (Import Inspection Fees) (Amendment) Regulations (Northern Ireland) 2007 (S.R. 2007 No. 21)
 Employment Rights (Increase of Limits) Order (Northern Ireland) 2007 (S.R. 2007 No. 22)
 Environmental Impact Assessment (Fish Farming in Marine Waters) Regulations (Northern Ireland) 2007 (S.R. 2007 No. 23)
 Recovery of Health Services Charges (Reviews and Appeals) Regulations (Northern Ireland) 2007 (S.R. 2007 No. 24)
 Special Educational Needs and Disability (2005 Order) (Commencement No. 1) (Amendment) Order (Northern Ireland) 2007 (S.R. 2007 No. 25)
 Pensions (2005 Order) (Code of Practice) (Modification of Subsisting Rights) (Appointed Day) Order (Northern Ireland) 2007 (S.R. 2007 No. 26)
 Less Favoured Area Compensatory Allowances Regulations (Northern Ireland) 2007 (S.R. 2007 No. 27)
 Street Works (Inspection Fees) (Amendment) Regulations (Northern Ireland) 2007 (S.R. 2007 No. 29)
 Rates (Unoccupied Hereditaments) Regulations (Northern Ireland) 2007 (S.R. 2007 No. 30)
 Control of Asbestos Regulations (Northern Ireland) 2007 (S.R. 2007 No. 31)
 Welfare of Animals (Transport) (Amendment) Regulations (Northern Ireland) 2007 (S.R. 2007 No. 32)
 Dairy Produce Quotas (Amendment) Regulations (Northern Ireland) 2007 (S.R. 2007 No. 33)
 Allocation of Housing and Homelessness (Eligibility) (Amendment) Regulations (Northern Ireland) 2007 (S.R. 2007 No. 34)
 Passenger and Goods Vehicles (Recording Equipment) (Tachograph Card) Regulations (Northern Ireland) 2007 (S.R. 2007 No. 36)
 Housing (Amendment) (2006 Order) (Commencement) Order (Northern Ireland) 2007 (S.R. 2007 No. 37)
 Prescribed Dwelling-house Regulations (Northern Ireland) 2007 (S.R. 2007 No. 38)
 Prescribed Fees and Charges Regulations (Northern Ireland) 2007 (S.R. 2007 No. 39)
 Rent Book (Savings) Order (Northern Ireland) 2007 (S.R. 2007 No. 40)
 Private Crossings (Signs and Barriers) Regulations (Northern Ireland) 2007 (S.R. 2007 No. 41)
 Education (2006 Order) (Commencement No. 1) Order (Northern Ireland) 2007 (S.R. 2007 No. 42)
 Education (Pupil Records and Reporting) (Transitional) Regulations (Northern Ireland) 2007 (S.R. 2007 No. 43)
 Education (Other Skills) Order (Northern Ireland) 2007 (S.R. 2007 No. 44)
 Education (Assessment Arrangements) (Foundation to Key Stage 3) Order (Northern Ireland) 2007 (S.R. 2007 No. 45)
 Education (Curriculum Minimum Content) Order (Northern Ireland) 2007 (S.R. 2007 No. 46)
 Railway Safety Regulations (Northern Ireland) 2007 (S.R. 2007 No. 47)
 Railway Safety (Miscellaneous Provisions) Regulations (Northern Ireland) 2007 (S.R. 2007 No. 48)
 Deposits in the Sea (Amendment) Regulations (Northern Ireland) 2007 (S.R. 2007 No. 51)
 Rates (Regional Rates) Order (Northern Ireland) 2007 (S.R. 2007 No. 52)
 Flexible Working (Eligibility, Complaints and Remedies) (Amendment) Regulations (Northern Ireland) 2007 (S.R. 2007 No. 53)
 Agriculture (Student fees) Regulations (Northern Ireland) 2007 (S.R. 2007 No. 54)
 Criminal Justice (2005 Order) (Commencement No. 3) Order (Northern Ireland) 2007 (S.R. 2007 No. 55)
 Criminal Justice (2003 Order) (Commencement No. 4) Order (Northern Ireland) 2007 (S.R. 2007 No. 56)
 Enterprise Ulster (Dissolution) Order (Northern Ireland) 2007 (S.R. 2007 No. 57)
 Police and Criminal Evidence (Northern Ireland) Order 1989 (Codes of Practice) (No. 3) Order 2007 (S.R. 2007 No. 58)
 Animals and Animal Products (Import and Export) (Amendment) Regulations (Northern Ireland) 2007 (S.R. 2007 No. 59)
 Notification of Marketing of Food for Particular Nutritional Uses Regulations (Northern Ireland) 2007 (S.R. 2007 No. 60)
 Rates Regulations (Northern Ireland) 2007 (S.R. 2007 No. 61)
 Health and Safety (Fees) Regulations (Northern Ireland) 2007 (S.R. 2007 No. 62)
 Occupational and Personal Pension Schemes (Prescribed Bodies) Regulations (Northern Ireland) 2007 (S.R. 2007 No. 64)
 Quick-Frozen Foodstuffs Regulations (Northern Ireland) 2007 (S.R. 2007 No. 65)
 Contaminants in Food Regulations (Northern Ireland) 2007 (S.R. 2007 No. 66)
 Social Security Investigation Powers (Arrangements with Great Britain) Regulations (Northern Ireland) 2007 (S.R. 2007 No. 67)
 Avian Influenza and Influenza of Avian Origin in Mammals Regulations (Northern Ireland) 2007 68)
 Avian Influenza (Vaccination) Regulations (Northern Ireland) 2007 (S.R. 2007 No. 69)
 Avian Influenza (Preventive Measures) Regulations (Northern Ireland) 2007 (S.R. 2007 No. 70)
 Rates (Recreational Hereditaments) Order (Northern Ireland) 2007 (S.R. 2007 No. 72)
 Social Security (Recovery of Benefits) (Amendment) Regulations (Northern Ireland) 2007 (S.R. 2007 No. 73)
 Health and Social Services Trusts (Membership and Procedure) (Amendment) Regulations (Northern Ireland) 2007 (S.R. 2007 No. 82)
 Horse Racing (Charges on Bookmakers) Order (Northern Ireland) 2007 (S.R. 2007 No. 83)
 Metering (Prescribed Consumer) Regulations (Northern Ireland) 2007 (S.R. 2007 No. 84)
 General Grant (Specified Bodies) Regulations (Northern Ireland) 2007 (S.R. 2007 No. 85)
 Rates (Social Sector Value) Regulations (Northern Ireland) 2007 (S.R. 2007 No. 86)
 Tenancy Terms Regulations (Northern Ireland) 2007 (S.R. 2007 No. 87)
 Rent Assessment Committees Regulations (Northern Ireland) 2007 (S.R. 2007 No. 88)
 Rent Book Regulations (Northern Ireland) 2007 (S.R. 2007 No. 89)
 Rates (Transitional Relief) Order (Northern Ireland) 2007 (S.R. 2007 No. 90)
 Employment (Northern Ireland) Order 2003 (Amendment of Schedules 2, 3 and 4) Order (Northern Ireland) 2007 (S.R. 2007 No. 91)
 Local Government (Early Termination of Employment) (Discretionary Compensation) Regulations (Northern Ireland) 2007 (S.R. 2007 No. 93)
 Smoke-free (Premises, Vehicle Operators and Penalty Notices) Regulations (Northern Ireland) 2007 (S.R. 2007 No. 94)
 Companies (Audit, Investigations and Community Enterprise) (2005 Order) (Commencement No. 2) Order (Northern Ireland) 2007 (S.R. 2007 No. 95)
 Public Service Vehicles (Licence Fees) (Amendment) Regulations (Northern Ireland) 2007 (S.R. 2007 No. 97)
 Motor Vehicle Testing (Amendment) Regulations (Northern Ireland) 2007 (S.R. 2007 No. 98)
 Blood Tests (Evidence of Paternity) (Amendment) Regulations (Northern Ireland) 2007 (S.R. 2007 No. 99)
 Fair Employment Tribunal (Remedies) (Amendment) Order (Northern Ireland) 2007 (S.R. 2007 No. 100)

101-200

 Industrial Tribunals (Interest on Awards in Sexual Orientation Discrimination Cases) (Amendment) Regulations (Northern Ireland) 2007 (S.R. 2007 No. 101)
 Industrial Tribunals (Interest on Awards in Sex and Disability Discrimination Cases) (Amendment) Regulations (Northern Ireland) 2007 (S.R. 2007 No. 102)
 Race Relations (Interest on Awards) (Amendment) Order (Northern Ireland) 2007 (S.R. 2007 No. 103)
 Renewables Obligation Order (Northern Ireland) 2007 (S.R. 2007 No. 104)
 Planning (General Development) (Amendment) Order (Northern Ireland) 2007 (S.R. 2007 No. 106)
 Milk (Cessation of Production) (Revocation) Scheme (Northern Ireland) 2007 (S.R. 2007 No. 107)
 Meat (Official Controls Charges) Regulations (Northern Ireland) 2007 (S.R. 2007 No. 108)
 Pneumoconiosis, etc., (Workers' Compensation) (Payment of Claims) (Amendment) Regulations (Northern Ireland) 2007 109)
 Quick-Frozen Foodstuffs (No.2) Regulations (Northern Ireland) 2007 (S.R. 2007 No. 110)
 Motor Vehicles (Driving Licences) (Amendment) Regulations (Northern Ireland) 2007 (S.R. 2007 No. 111)
 Social Security (Preparation for Employment Programme 50 to 59 Pilot) Regulations (Northern Ireland) 2007 (S.R. 2007 No. 113)
 Cross-Border Insolvency Regulations (Northern Ireland) 2007 (S.R. 2007 No. 115)
 Food Supplements (Amendment) Regulations (Northern Ireland) 2007 (S.R. 2007 No. 116)
 Smoking (2006 Order) (Commencement) Order (Northern Ireland) 2007 (S.R. 2007 No. 118)
 Non-Domestic Rating (Unoccupied Hereditaments) Regulations (Northern Ireland) 2007 (S.R. 2007 No. 119)
 Rates (Exclusion from Service of Completion Notices) Regulations (Northern Ireland) 2007 (S.R. 2007 No. 120)
 Housing Benefit (Daily Liability Entitlement) (Amendment) Regulations (Northern Ireland) 2007 (S.R. 2007 No. 121)
 Water Abstraction and Impoundment (Licensing) (Amendment) Regulations (Northern Ireland) 2007 (S.R. 2007 No. 122)
 Colours in Food (Amendment) Regulations (Northern Ireland) 2007 (S.R. 2007 No. 123)
 Measuring Instruments (EEC Requirements) (Verification Fees) Regulations (Northern Ireland) 2007 (S.R. 2007 No. 124)
 Weights and Measures (Passing as Fit for Use for Trade and Adjustment Fees) Regulations (Northern Ireland) 2007 (S.R. 2007 No. 125)
 Local Government (General ) (Amendment) Regulations (Northern Ireland) 2007 (S.R. 2007 No. 126)
 Further Education Teachers' (Eligibility) Regulations (Northern Ireland) 2007 (S.R. 2007 No. 127)
 Social Security (Claims and Payments) (Amendment) Regulations (Northern Ireland) 2007 (S.R. 2007 No. 128)
 Social Security (Incapacity Benefit Work-focused Interviews) (Amendment) Regulations (Northern Ireland) 2007 (S.R. 2007 No. 129)
 Police Service of Northern Ireland (Unsatisfactory Performance and Attendance) Regulations 2007 (S.R. 2007 No. 130)
 Private Tenancies (Forms etc.) Regulations (Northern Ireland) 2007 (S.R. 2007 No. 131)
 Health and Social Services Trusts (Dissolution) Order (Northern Ireland) 2007 (S.R. 2007 No. 132)
 Official Controls (Animals, Feed and Food) Regulations (Northern Ireland) 2007 (S.R. 2007 No. 133)
 Smoke-Free (Signs) Regulations (Northern Ireland) 2007 (S.R. 2007 No. 134)
 Work at Height (Amendment) Regulations (Northern Ireland) 2007 (S.R. 2007 No. 135)
 Curd Cheese (Restriction on Placing on the Market) (Revocation) Regulations (Northern Ireland) 2007 (S.R. 2007 No. 136)
 Teachers' Pensions etc. (Reform Amendments) Regulations (Northern Ireland) 2007 (S.R. 2007 No. 137)
 Smoke-free (Exemptions, Vehicles, Penalties and Discounted Amounts) Regulations (Northern Ireland) 2007 (S.R. 2007 No. 138)
 Guaranteed Minimum Pensions Increase Order (Northern Ireland) 2007 (S.R. 2007 No. 139)
 Charges for Drugs and Appliances (Amendment) Regulations (Northern Ireland) 2007 (S.R. 2007 No. 140)
 Optical Charges and Payments (Amendment) Regulations (Northern Ireland) 2007 (S.R. 2007 No. 141)
 Recovery of Health Services Charges (Consequential Provisions) Order (Northern Ireland) 2007 (S.R. 2007 No. 142)
 Firefighters' Compensation Scheme Order (Northern Ireland) 2007 (S.R. 2007 No. 143)
 Firefighters' Pension Scheme Order (Northern Ireland) 2007 (S.R. 2007 No. 144)
 Water and Sewerage Services (Transfer Date) Order (Northern Ireland) 2007 (S.R. 2007 No. 145)
 Social Security and Child Support Commissioners (Procedure) (Amendment) Regulations (Northern Ireland) 2007 (S.R. 2007 No. 146)
 Water Supply (Water Quality) Regulations (Northern Ireland) 2007 (S.R. 2007 No. 147)
 Rate Relief (Education, Training and Leaving Care) Regulations (Northern Ireland) 2007 (S.R. 2007 No. 148)
 Rates (Payment of Interest) Regulations (Northern Ireland) 2007 (S.R. 2007 No. 149)
 Rates (Appeals) Regulations (Northern Ireland) 2007 (S.R. 2007 No. 150)
 Water and Sewerage Charges Scheme Regulations (Northern Ireland) 2007 (S.R. 2007 No. 151)
 Local Government Pension Scheme (Amendment) Regulations (Northern Ireland) 2007 (S.R. 2007 No. 152)
 Social Security Benefits Up-rating Order (Northern Ireland) 2007 (S.R. 2007 No. 153)
 Social Security (Miscellaneous Amendments) Regulations (Northern Ireland) 2007 (S.R. 2007 No. 154)
 Social Security Benefits Up-rating Regulations (Northern Ireland) 2007 (S.R. 2007 No. 155)
 Social Security (Industrial Injuries) (Dependency) (Permitted Earnings Limits) Order (Northern Ireland) 2007 (S.R. 2007 No. 156)
 Pension Protection Fund (Waiver of Pension Protection Levy and Consequential Amendments) Regulations (Northern Ireland) 2007 (S.R. 2007 No. 157)
 Road Humps (Amendment) Regulations (Northern Ireland) 2007 158)
 Local Government (Boundaries 2006) (Commencement No. 1) Order (Northern Ireland) 2007 (S.R. 2007 No. 159)
 Water and Sewerage Services (Successor Company) Order (Northern Ireland) 2007 (S.R. 2007 No. 160)
 Health and Personal Social Services (Assessment of Resources) (Amendment) Regulations (Northern Ireland) 2007 (S.R. 2007 No. 161)
 Health and Personal Social Services (Quality, Improvement and Regulation) (2003 Order) (Specified Agency) Order (Northern Ireland) 2007 (S.R. 2007 No. 162)
 Social Security Revaluation of Earnings Factors Order (Northern Ireland) 2007 (S.R. 2007 No. 163)
 Social Security Pensions (Low Earnings Threshold) Order (Northern Ireland) 2007 (S.R. 2007 No. 164)
 Offshore Safety (Miscellaneous Amendments) Regulations (Northern Ireland) 2007 (S.R. 2007 No. 165)
 Legal Aid (Scope) Regulations (Northern Ireland) 2007 (S.R. 2007 No. 166)
 Social Security (Industrial Injuries) (Prescribed Diseases) (Amendment) Regulations (Northern Ireland) 2007 (S.R. 2007 No. 167)
 Local Government (Payments to Councillors) (Amendment) Regulations (Northern Ireland) 2007 (S.R. 2007 No. 168)
 Pensions Increase (Review) Order (Northern Ireland) 2007 (S.R. 2007 No. 170)
 Workmen's Compensation (Supplementation) (Amendment) Regulations (Northern Ireland) 2007 (S.R. 2007 No. 172)
 Legal Advice and Assistance (Amendment) Regulations (Northern Ireland) 2007 (S.R. 2007 No. 173)
 Legal Advice and Assistance (Financial Conditions) Regulations (Northern Ireland) 2007 (S.R. 2007 No. 174)
 Legal Aid (Financial Conditions) Regulations (Northern Ireland) 2007 (S.R. 2007 No. 175)
 Criminal Evidence (1999 Order) (Commencement No. 5) Order (Northern Ireland) 2007 (S.R. 2007 No. 176)
 Police (Northern Ireland) Act 2003 (Commencement No. 2) Order 2007 (S.R. 2007 No. 177)
 Landfill (Amendment) Regulations (Northern Ireland) 2007 (S.R. 2007 No. 179)
 Rating of Quarries (Plant and Machinery) Order (Northern Ireland) 2007 (S.R. 2007 No. 180)
 Pension Protection Fund (Liability to pay a Contributions Equivalent Premium) Regulations (Northern Ireland) 2007 (S.R. 2007 No. 181)
 Valuation Tribunal Rules (Northern Ireland) 2007 (S.R. 2007 No. 182)
 Rates (Maximum Capital Value) Regulations (Northern Ireland) 2007 (S.R. 2007 No. 184)
 Occupational and Personal Pension Schemes (Miscellaneous Amendments) Regulations (Northern Ireland) 2007 (S.R. 2007 No. 185)
 Pension Protection Fund (Closed Schemes) Regulations (Northern Ireland) 2007 (S.R. 2007 No. 186)
 Urban Waste Water Treatment Regulations (Northern Ireland) 2007 (S.R. 2007 No. 187)
Healthy Start Scheme and Day Care Food Scheme (Amendment) Regulations (Northern Ireland) 2007 (S.R. 2007 No. 188)
 Rules of the Supreme Court (Northern Ireland) (Amendment) 2007 (S.R. 2007 No. 189)
 Biocidal Products (Amendment) Regulations (Northern Ireland) 2007 (S.R. 2007 No. 190)
 Rates (Transitional Provisions) Order (Northern Ireland) 2007 (S.R. 2007 No. 191)
 Rates (Consequential Provisions) Order (Northern Ireland) 2007 (S.R. 2007 No. 192)
 Pension Protection Fund (Miscellaneous Amendments) Regulations (Northern Ireland) 2007 (S.R. 2007 No. 193)
 Water and Sewerage Services (2006 Order) (Commencement No. 1 and Transitional Provisions) Order (Northern Ireland) 2007 (S.R. 2007 No. 194)
 Education (Student Support) Regulations (Northern Ireland) 2007 (S.R. 2007 No. 195)
 Social Security and Child Support (Miscellaneous Amendments) Regulations (Northern Ireland) 2007 (S.R. 2007 No. 196)
 Education (2006 Order) (Commencement No. 2) Order (Northern Ireland) 2007 (S.R. 2007 No. 197)
 Producer Responsibility Obligations (Packaging Waste) Regulations (Northern Ireland) 2007 (S.R. 2007 No. 198)
 Products of Animal Origin (Third Country Imports) Regulations (Northern Ireland) 2007 (S.R. 2007 No. 199)

201-300

 Rate Relief (Qualifying Age) Regulations (Northern Ireland) 2007 (S.R. 2007 No. 203)
 Rate Relief (General) Regulations (Northern Ireland) 2007 (S.R. 2007 No. 204)
 Water Industry (Determination of Turnover for Penalties) Order (Northern Ireland) 2007 (S.R. 2007 No. 205)
 Social Security (Claims and Payments) (Amendment No. 2) Regulations (Northern Ireland) 2007 (S.R. 2007 No. 206)
 Avian Influenza (H5N1 in Poultry) Regulations (Northern Ireland) 2007 (S.R. 2007 No. 207)
 Avian Influenza (H5N1 in Wild Birds) Regulations (Northern Ireland) 2007 (S.R. 2007 No. 208)
 Poultry Breeding Flocks and Hatcheries Scheme Order (Northern Ireland) 2007 (S.R. 2007 No. 209)
 Occupational Pension Schemes (Levies) (Amendment) Regulations (Northern Ireland) 2007 (S.R. 2007 No. 210)
 Pension Protection Fund (Pension Compensation Cap) Order (Northern Ireland) 2007 (S.R. 2007 No. 211)
 Occupational Pension Schemes (Levy Ceiling) Order (Northern Ireland) 2007 (S.R. 2007 No. 212)
 Police (Northern Ireland) Act 2000 (Renewal of Temporary Provisions) Order 2007 214)
 New Firefighters' Pension Scheme Order (Northern Ireland) 2007 (S.R. 2007 No. 215)
 Social Security (Work-focused Interviews for Lone Parents) (Amendment) Regulations (Northern Ireland) 2007 (S.R. 2007 No. 219)
 Health and Personal Social Services (Quality, Improvement and Regulation) (2003 Order) (Commencement No. 4 and Transitional Provisions) Order (Northern Ireland) 2007 (S.R. 2007 No. 220)
 Adult Placement Agencies Regulations (Northern Ireland) 2007 (S.R. 2007 No. 221)
 Regulation and Improvement Authority (Registration) (Amendment) Regulations (Northern Ireland) 2007 (S.R. 2007 No. 222)
 Regulation and Improvement Authority (Fees and Frequency of Inspections) (Amendment) Regulations (Northern Ireland) 2007 (S.R. 2007 No. 223)
 Animals and Animal Products (Import and Export) (Amendment No.2) Regulations (Northern Ireland) 2007 (S.R. 2007 No. 224)
 Employment Equality (Age) (Consequential Amendments) Regulations (Northern Ireland) 2007 (S.R. 2007 No. 225)
 Community Benefit Societies (Restriction on Use of Assets) (Amendment) Regulations (Northern Ireland) 2007 (S.R. 2007 No. 226)
 Day Care Setting Regulations (Northern Ireland) 2007 (S.R. 2007 No. 234)
 Domiciliary Care Agencies Regulations (Northern Ireland) 2007 (S.R. 2007 No. 235)
 Residential Family Centres Regulations (Northern Ireland) 2007 (S.R. 2007 No. 236)
 Justice (Northern Ireland) Act 2002 (Commencement No. 12) Order 2007 (S.R. 2007 No. 237)
 Motor Vehicles (Construction and Use) (Amendment No. 2) Regulations (Northern Ireland) 2007 (S.R. 2007 No. 238)
 Road Vehicles Lighting (Amendment) Regulations (Northern Ireland) 2007 (S.R. 2007 No. 239)
 Motor Vehicles (Type Approval) Regulations (Northern Ireland) 2007 (S.R. 2007 No. 240)
 Motorways Traffic (Amendment) Regulations (Northern Ireland) 2007 (S.R. 2007 No. 242)
 River Lagan Tidal Navigation and General Bye-laws (Northern Ireland) 2007 (S.R. 2007 No. 243)
 Rate Relief (Qualifying Age) (Amendment) Regulations (Northern Ireland) 2007 (S.R. 2007 No. 244)
 Pollution Prevention and Control (Amendment) Regulations (Northern Ireland) 2007 (S.R. 2007 No. 245)
 Bee Diseases and Pests Control Order (Northern Ireland) 2007 (S.R. 2007 No. 246)
 Offshore Installations (Safety Case) Regulations (Northern Ireland) 2007 (S.R. 2007 No. 247)
 Disability Discrimination (Taxis) (Carrying of Guide Dogs etc.) (Amendment) Regulations (Northern Ireland) 2007 (S.R. 2007 No. 248)
 Plant Protection Products (Amendment) Regulations (Northern Ireland) 2007 (S.R. 2007 No. 251)
 Plant Health (Import Inspection Fees) (Amendment No. 2) Regulations (Northern Ireland) 2007 (S.R. 2007 No. 252)
 Lands Tribunal (Salaries) Order (Northern Ireland) 2007 (S.R. 2007 No. 255)
 Landfill (Amendment No. 2) Regulations (Northern Ireland) 2007 (S.R. 2007 No. 258)
 Salaries (Comptroller and Auditor General) Order (Northern Ireland) 2007 (S.R. 2007 No. 259)
 Whole of Government Accounts (Designation of Bodies) Order (Northern Ireland) 2007 (S.R. 2007 No. 260)
 Equality Act (Sexual Orientation) (Amendment No. 2) Regulations (Northern Ireland) 2007 (S.R. 2007 No. 261)
 Jobseeker's Allowance (Extension of the Preparation for Employment Programme) (Amendment) Regulations (Northern Ireland) 2007 (S.R. 2007 No. 262)
 Social Security and Housing Benefit (Amendment) Regulations (Northern Ireland) 2007 (S.R. 2007 No. 263)
 Travelling Expenses and Remission of Charges (Amendment) Regulations (Northern Ireland) 2007 (S.R. 2007 No. 264)
 Air Quality Standards Regulations (Northern Ireland) 2007 (S.R. 2007 No. 265)
 Housing Benefit (Miscellaneous Amendments) Regulations (Northern Ireland) 2007 (S.R. 2007 No. 266)
 Health and Social Services Trusts (Establishment) (Amendment) Order (Northern Ireland) 2007 (S.R. 2007 No. 269)
 Pig Carcase (Grading) (Amendment) Regulations (Northern Ireland) 2007 (S.R. 2007 No. 271)
 Sulphur Content of Liquid Fuels Regulations (Northern Ireland) 2007 (S.R. 2007 No. 272)
 Phosphorus (Use in Agriculture) (Amendment) Regulations (Northern Ireland) 2007 (S.R. 2007 No. 273)
 Foyle Area and Carlingford Area (Angling) (Amendment) Regulations 2007 (S.R. 2007 No. 274)
 Foyle Area (Control of Drift and Draft Net Fishing) (Amendment) Regulations 2007 (S.R. 2007 No. 275)
 Foyle Area (Control of Netting) (Amendment) Regulations 2007 (S.R. 2007 No. 276)
 Foyle Area and Carlingford Area (Licensing of Fishing Engines) (Amendment No. 2) Regulations 2007 (S.R. 2007 No. 277)
 Foyle Area and Carlingford Area (Tagging and Logbook) (Amendment) Regulations 2007 (S.R. 2007 No. 278)
 Transport of Animals and Poultry (Cleansing and Disinfection) Order (Northern Ireland) 2007 (S.R. 2007 No. 279)
 Water and Sewerage Charges Scheme (No. 2) Regulations (Northern Ireland) 2007 (S.R. 2007 No. 280)
 Pollution of Water: Offences (Determination of Liability) Regulations (Northern Ireland) 2007 (S.R. 2007 No. 281)
 Water and Sewerage Services (2006 Order) (Commencement No. 2) Order (Northern Ireland) 2007 (S.R. 2007 No. 282)
 Energy (2003 Order) (Commencement No. 4) Order (Northern Ireland) 2007 (S.R. 2007 No. 283)
 Electricity (Single Wholesale Market) (2007 Order) (Commencement No. 1) Order (Northern Ireland) 2007 (S.R. 2007 No. 284)
 Electricity (Applications for Licences and Extensions of Licences) Regulations (Northern Ireland) 2007 (S.R. 2007 No. 285)
 Transfer of State Pensions and Benefits Regulations (Northern Ireland) 2007 (S.R. 2007 No. 286)
 Pharmaceutical Society of Northern Ireland (General) (Amendment) Regulations (Northern Ireland) 2007 (S.R. 2007 No. 287)
 Education (Prohibition from Teaching or Working with Children) Regulations (Northern Ireland) 2007 (S.R. 2007 No. 288)
 Electricity (Applications for Licences and Extensions of Licences) (No. 2) Regulations (Northern Ireland) 2007 (S.R. 2007 No. 289)
 Industrial Court (Proceedings) Rules (Northern Ireland) 2007 (S.R. 2007 No. 290)
 Construction (Design and Management) Regulations (Northern Ireland) 2007 (S.R. 2007 No. 291)
 General Dental Services (Amendment) Regulations (Northern Ireland) 2007 (S.R. 2007 No. 292)
 Education (Student Support) (Amendment) Regulations (Northern Ireland) 2007 (S.R. 2007 No. 293)
 Waste (Amendment) (2007 Order) (Commencement No. 1) Order (Northern Ireland) 2007 (S.R. 2007 No. 294)
 Social Security (Netherlands) Order (Northern Ireland) 2007 (S.R. 2007 No. 295)
 Legal Aid in Criminal Proceedings (Costs) (Amendment) Rules (Northern Ireland) 2007 (S.R. 2007 No. 296)
 Register of Occupational and Personal Pension Schemes (Amendment) Regulations (Northern Ireland) 2007 (S.R. 2007 No. 297)
 Social Security (Students and Income-related Benefits) (Amendment) Regulations (Northern Ireland) 2007 (S.R. 2007 No. 298)
 Construction (Use of Explosives) (Amendment) Regulations (Northern Ireland) 2007 (S.R. 2007 No. 299)

301-400

 Addition of Vitamins, Minerals and Other Substances Regulations (Northern Ireland) 2007 (S.R. 2007 No. 301)
 Road Traffic (2007 Order) (Commencement No. 1) Order (Northern Ireland) 2007 (S.R. 2007 No. 302)
 Electricity (Single Wholesale Market) (2007 Order) (Commencement No. 2) Order (Northern Ireland) 2007 (S.R. 2007 No. 303)
 Spreadable Fats (Marketing Standards) (Amendment) Regulations (Northern Ireland) 2007 (S.R. 2007 No. 304)
 Social Security (Miscellaneous Amendments No. 2) Regulations (Northern Ireland) 2007 (S.R. 2007 No. 306)
 Bovine Products (Restriction on Placing on the Market) (No. 2) (Amendment) Regulations (Northern Ireland) 2007 (S.R. 2007 No. 307)
 Smoke Control Areas (Exempted Fireplaces) (Amendment) Regulations (Northern Ireland) 2007 (S.R. 2007 No. 308)
 Education (Core Syllabus for Religious Education) Order (Northern Ireland) 2007 (S.R. 2007 No. 309)
 Traffic Signs (Amendment) Regulations (Northern Ireland) 2007 (S.R. 2007 No. 311)
 Harbour Works (Environmental Impact Assessment) (Amendment) Regulations (Northern Ireland) 2007 (S.R. 2007 No. 312)
 Folly Lane, Downpatrick (Stopping- Up Order) (Northern Ireland) 2007 (S.R. 2007 313)
 Products of Animal Origin (Third Country Imports) (Amendment) Regulations (Northern Ireland) 2007 (S.R. 2007 No. 314)
 Newton Heights, Belfast (Footpath) (Abandonment) Order (Northern Ireland) 2007 (S.R. 2007 315)
 Elgin Street, Belfast (Footpath) (Abandonment) Order (Northern Ireland) 2007 (S.R. 2007 316)
 Motor Vehicles (Driving Licences) (Amendment No. 2) Regulations (Northern Ireland) 2007 (S.R. 2007 No. 317)
 Road Traffic (Fixed Penalty) (Offences) (Amendment) Order (Northern Ireland) 2007 (S.R. 2007 No. 318)
 Road Traffic (Fixed Penalty) Order (Northern Ireland) 2007 (S.R. 2007 No. 319)
 Energy (2003 Order) (Commencement No. 5) Order (Northern Ireland) 2007 (S.R. 2007 No. 320)
 Electricity Regulations (Northern Ireland) 2007 (S.R. 2007 No. 321)
 Electricity (Class Exemptions from the Requirement for a Licence) Order (Northern Ireland) 2007 (S.R. 2007 No. 322)
 Road Transport (Working Time) (Amendment) Regulations (Northern Ireland) 2007 (S.R. 2007 No. 323)
 Family Proceedings (Amendment) Rules (Northern Ireland) 2007 (S.R. 2007 No. 324)
 Miscellaneous Food Additives and the Sweeteners in Food (Amendment) Regulations (Northern Ireland) 2007 (S.R. 2007 No. 325)
 Student Fees (Qualifying Courses and Persons) (2006 Regulations) (Amendment) Regulations (Northern Ireland) 2007 (S.R. 2007 No. 326)
 Animals and Animal Products (Import and Export) (Circuses and Avian Quarantine) Regulations (Northern Ireland) 2007 (S.R. 2007 No. 327)
 Student Fees (Qualifying Courses and Persons) Regulations (Northern Ireland) 2007 (S.R. 2007 No. 328)
 Education (Student Loans) (Amendment) Regulations (Northern Ireland) 2007 (S.R. 2007 No. 329)
 Social Security (Claims and Payments) (Amendment No. 3) Regulations (Northern Ireland) 2007 (S.R. 2007 No. 330)
 Health Protection Agency Order (Northern Ireland) 2007 (S.R. 2007 No. 331)
 Social Security (Miscellaneous Amendments No. 3) Regulations (Northern Ireland) 2007 (S.R. 2007 No. 332)
 Plant Health (Amendment) Order (Northern Ireland) 2007 (S.R. 2007 No. 333)
 Protection of Children and Vulnerable Adults (2003 Order) (Commencement No. 3) Order (Northern Ireland) 2007 (S.R. 2007 No. 334)
 Welfare Reform (2007 Act) (Commencement No. 1) Order (Northern Ireland) 2007 (S.R. 2007 No. 335)
 Students Awards (Amendment) Regulations (Northern Ireland) 2007 (S.R. 2007 No. 336)
 Pneumoconiosis, etc., (Workers' Compensation) (Prescribed Occupations) Order (Northern Ireland) 2007 (S.R. 2007 No. 337)
 Occupational Pension Schemes (Winding Up, Winding Up Notices and Reports, etc.) (Amendment) Regulations (Northern Ireland) 200 S.R. 2007 No. 338)
 Transmissible Spongiform Encephalopathies (Amendment) Regulations (Northern Ireland) 2007 (S.R. 2007 No. 339)
 Working Time (Amendment) Regulations (Northern Ireland) 2007 (S.R. 2007 No. 340)
 Social Security (Industrial Injuries) (Prescribed Diseases) (Amendment No. 2) Regulations (Northern Ireland) 2007 (S.R. 2007 No. 341)
 Further Education (Student Support) (Eligibility) Regulations (Northern Ireland) 2007 (S.R. 2007 No. 342)
 Industrial Training Levy (Construction Industry) Order (Northern Ireland) 2007 (S.R. 2007 No. 343)
 Company and Business Names (Amendment) Regulations (Northern Ireland) 2007 (S.R. 2007 No. 344)
 Conservation (Natural Habitats, etc.) (Amendment) Regulations (Northern Ireland) 2007 (S.R. 2007 No. 345)
 Roads (Environmental Impact Assessment) Regulations (Northern Ireland) 2007 (S.R. 2007 No. 346)
 Child Support (Miscellaneous Amendments) Regulations (Northern Ireland) 2007 (S.R. 2007 No. 347)
 Misuse of Drugs and Misuse of Drugs (Safe Custody) (Amendment) Regulations (Northern Ireland) 2007 (S.R. 2007 No. 348)
 Nutrition and Health Claims Regulations (Northern Ireland) 2007 (S.R. 2007 No. 349)
 Route U1541 Creevangar Road, Omagh (Abandonment) Order (Northern Ireland) 2007 (S.R. 2007 350)
 Queens Road, Antrim (Abandonment) Order (Northern Ireland) 2007 (S.R. 2007 351)
 Food (Suspension of the Use of E 128 Red 2G as Food Colour) Regulations (Northern Ireland) 2007 (S.R. 2007 No. 352)
 Pig Production Development Committee (Winding Up) Order (Northern Ireland) 2007 (S.R. 2007 No. 354)
 Environmental Impact Assessment (Forestry) (Amendment) Regulations (Northern Ireland) 2007 (S.R. 2007 No. 355)
 Thornhill Road, Dungannon (Abandonment) Order (Northern Ireland) 2007 (S.R. 2007 356)
 Export Restrictions (Foot-and-Mouth Disease) Regulations (Northern Ireland) 2007 (S.R. 2007 No. 357)
 Education (Student Loans) (Repayment) (Amendment) Regulations (Northern Ireland) 2007 (S.R. 2007 No. 360)
 Less Favoured Area Compensatory Allowances (No. 2) Regulations (Northern Ireland) 2007 (S.R. 2007 No. 361)
 Social Security (1989 Order) (Commencement No. 4) Order (Northern Ireland) 2007 (S.R. 2007 No. 362)
 Education (Student Support) (Amendment) (No. 2) Regulations (Northern Ireland) 2007 (S.R. 2007 No. 363)
 Export Restrictions (Foot-and-Mouth Disease) (Amendment) Regulations (Northern Ireland) 2007 (S.R. 2007 No. 364)
 Street Works (2007 Amendment Order) (Commencement No. 1) Order (Northern Ireland) 2007 (S.R. 2007 No. 365)
 Shaftesbury Road, Bangor (Abandonment) Order (Northern Ireland) 2007 (S.R. 2007 368)
 B82 Killadeas Road, Kesh (Abandonment) Order (Northern Ireland) 2007 (S.R. 2007 369)
 A2 Clooney Road, Faughanvale (Abandonment) Order (Northern Ireland) 2007 (S.R. 2007 370)
 Police (Northern Ireland) Act 2003 (Commencement No.3) Order 2007 (S.R. 2007 No. 371)
 Local Government Pension Scheme (Amendment No. 2) Regulations (Northern Ireland) 2007 (S.R. 2007 No. 372)
 Student Fees (Qualifying Courses and Persons) (Amendment) Regulations (Northern Ireland) 2007 (S.R. 2007 No. 375)
 Supreme Court Fees (Amendment) Order (Northern Ireland) 2007 (S.R. 2007 No. 376)
 Supreme Court (Non-Contentious Probate) Fees (Amendment) Order (Northern Ireland) 2007 (S.R. 2007 No. 377)
 County Court Fees (Amendment) Order (Northern Ireland) 2007 (S.R. 2007 No. 378)
 Magistrates' Courts Fees (Amendment) Order (Northern Ireland) 2007 (S.R. 2007 No. 379)
 Judgment Enforcement Fees (Amendment) Order (Northern Ireland) 2007 (S.R. 2007 No. 380)
 Family Proceedings Fees (Amendment) Order (Northern Ireland) 2007 (S.R. 2007 No. 381)
 Independent Living Fund (2006) Order (Northern Ireland) 2007 (S.R. 2007 No. 382)
 Measuring Instruments (Automatic Catchweighers) (Use for Trade) Regulations (Northern Ireland) 2007 (S.R. 2007 No. 383)
 Measuring Instruments (Automatic Gravimetric Filling Instruments) (Use for Trade) Regulations (Northern Ireland) 2007 (S.R. 2007 No. 384)
 Measuring Instruments (Liquid Fuel and Lubricants) (Use for Trade) Regulations (Northern Ireland) 2007 (S.R. 2007 No. 385)
 Measuring Instruments (Beltweighers) (Use for Trade) Regulations (Northern Ireland) 2007 (S.R. 2007 No. 386)
 Measuring Instruments (Capacity Serving Measures) (Use for Trade) Regulations (Northern Ireland) 2007 (S.R. 2007 No. 387)
 Measuring Instruments (Liquid Fuel by Road Tanker) (Use for Trade) Regulations (Northern Ireland) 2007 (S.R. 2007 No. 388)
 Measuring Instruments (Automatic Discontinuous Totalisers) (Use for Trade) Regulations (Northern Ireland) 2007 (S.R. 2007 No. 389)
 Measuring Instruments (Material Measures of Length) (Use for Trade) Regulations (Northern Ireland) 2007 (S.R. 2007 No. 390)
 Measuring Equipment (Liquid Fuel and Lubricants) (Amendment) Regulations (Northern Ireland) 2007 (S.R. 2007 No. 391)
 Social Security (Miscellaneous Amendments No. 4) Regulations (Northern Ireland) 2007 (S.R. 2007 No. 392)
 Flexible Working (Eligibility, Complaints and Remedies) (Amendment) (No. 2) Regulations (Northern Ireland) 2007 (S.R. 2007 No. 393)
 Companies (Tables A to F) (Amendment) Regulations (Northern Ireland) 2007 (S.R. 2007 No. 394)
 Social Security (National Insurance Credits) (Amendment) Regulations (Northern Ireland) 2007 (S.R. 2007 No. 395)
 Social Security (Miscellaneous Amendments No. 5) Regulations (Northern Ireland) 2007 (S.R. 2007 No. 396)
 Magistrates' Courts (Children (Northern Ireland) Order 1995) (Amendment) Rules (Northern Ireland) 2007 (S.R. 2007 No. 397)
 Magistrates' Courts (Domestic Proceedings) (Amendment) Rules (Northern Ireland) 2007 (S.R. 2007 No. 398)
 Export Restrictions (Foot-and-Mouth Disease) (Amendment No. 2) Regulations (Northern Ireland) 2007 (S.R. 2007 No. 399)
 Marketing of Vegetable Plant Material (Amendment) Regulations (Northern Ireland) 2007 (S.R. 2007 No. 400)

401-500

 Seed Potatoes (Amendment) Regulations (Northern Ireland) 2007 (S.R. 2007 No. 401)
 General Teaching Council for Northern Ireland (Approval of Qualifications) Regulations (Northern Ireland) 2007 (S.R. 2007 No. 402)
 Health and Safety at Work Order (Application to Environmentally Hazardous Substances) (Amendment) Regulations (Northern Ireland) 2007 (S.R. 2007 No. 403)
 Motor Vehicles (Construction and Use) (Amendment No. 3) Regulations (Northern Ireland) 2007 (S.R. 2007 No. 404)
 Surface Waters (Fishlife) (Classification) (Amendment) Regulations (Northern Ireland) 2007 (S.R. 2007 No. 405)
 Gas (Designation of Pipelines) Order (Northern Ireland) 2007 (S.R. 2007 No. 406)
 Sea Fishing (Restriction on Days at Sea) Order (Northern Ireland) 2007 (S.R. 2007 No. 407)
 Food for Particular Nutritional Uses (Miscellaneous Amendments) Regulations (Northern Ireland) 2007 (S.R. 2007 No. 408)
 Lands Tribunal (Amendment) Rules (Northern Ireland) 2007 (S.R. 2007 No. 409)
 Agriculture (Student fees) (Amendment) Regulations (Northern Ireland) 2007 (S.R. 2007 No. 410)
 College Park, Belfast (Abandonment) Order (Northern Ireland) 2007 (S.R. 2007 No. 412)
 Finvoy Road, Ballymoney (Abandonment) Order (Northern Ireland) 2007 (S.R. 2007 No. 413)
 Sandholes Road, Cookstown (Abandonment) Order (Northern Ireland) 2007 (S.R. 2007 No. 414)
 A22 Downpatrick Road, Killyleagh (Abandonment) Order (Northern Ireland) 2007 (S.R. 2007 No. 415)
 Game Preservation (Special Protection for Irish Hares) Order (Northern Ireland) 2007 (S.R. 2007 No. 416)
 Agricultural and Forestry Marketing Development Grant Regulations (Northern Ireland) 2007 (S.R. 2007 No. 417)
 Agricultural and Forestry Processing and Marketing Grant Regulations (Northern Ireland) 2007 (S.R. 2007 No. 418)
 Plastic Materials and Articles in Contact with Food (Lid Gaskets) Regulations (Northern Ireland) 2007 (S.R. 2007 No. 419)
 Natural Mineral Water, Spring Water and Bottled Drinking Water Regulations (Northern Ireland) 2007 (S.R. 2007 No. 420)
 Environmental Impact Assessment (Agriculture) Regulations (Northern Ireland) 2007 (S.R. 2007 No. 421)
 U1110 Green Road, Londonderry (Abandonment) Order (Northern Ireland) 2007 (S.R. 2007 No. 422)
 Companies (Tables A to F) (Amendment No. 2) Regulations (Northern Ireland) 2007 (S.R. 2007 No. 425)
 Steelstown Road, Londonderry (Abandonment) Order (Northern Ireland) 2007 4S.R. 2007 No. 426)
 Galgorm Road, Ballymena (Abandonment) Order (Northern Ireland) 2007 (S.R. 2007 No. 427)
 Pesticides (Maximum Residue Levels in Crops, Food and Feeding Stuffs) (Amendment) Regulations (Northern Ireland) 2007 (S.R. 2007 No. 428)
 Welfare Reform (2007 Act) (Commencement No. 2) Order (Northern Ireland) 2007 (S.R. 2007 No. 429)
 Disability Discrimination (2006 Order) (Commencement No. 3) Order (Northern Ireland) 2007 (S.R. 2007 No. 430)
 Social Security (Attendance Allowance and Disability Living Allowance) (Amendment) Regulations (Northern Ireland) 2007 (S.R. 2007 No. 431)
 Planning (General Development) (Amendment No. 2) Order (Northern Ireland) 2007 (S.R. 2007 No. 432)
 Electricity (Class Exemptions from the Requirement for a Licence) (Amendment) Order (Northern Ireland) 2007 (S.R. 2007 No. 433)
 Materials and Articles in Contact with Food Regulations (Northern Ireland) 2007 (S.R. 2007 No. 434)
 Motor Vehicles (Driving Licences) (Fees) (Amendment) Regulations (Northern Ireland) 2007 (S.R. 2007 No. 435)
 General Ophthalmic Services Regulations (Northern Ireland) 2007 (S.R. 2007 No. 436)
 Travelling Expenses and Remission of Charges (Amendment No. 2) Regulations (Northern Ireland) 2007 (S.R. 2007 No. 437)
 Social Security (Ireland) Order (Northern Ireland) 2007 (S.R. 2007 No. 438)
 Road Races (Rally Ireland) Order (Northern Ireland) 2007 (S.R. 2007 No. 439)
 Renewables Obligation (Amendment) Order (Northern Ireland) 2007 (S.R. 2007 No. 440)
 Export Restrictions (Foot-and-Mouth Disease) (Amendment No. 3) Regulations (Northern Ireland) 2007 (S.R. 2007 No. 441)
 Student Fees (Amounts) (Amendment) Regulations (Northern Ireland) 2007 (S.R. 2007 No. 442)
 Contaminants in Food (Amendment) Regulations (Northern Ireland) 2007 (S.R. 2007 No. 443)
 Electricity (Single Wholesale Market) (2007 Order) (Commencement No. 3) Order (Northern Ireland) 2007 (S.R. 2007 No. 444)
 B127 Ballyconnell Road, Derrylin (Abandonment) Order (Northern Ireland) 2007 (S.R. 2007 No. 446)
 Plant Health (Phytophthora ramorum) (Amendment) Order (Northern Ireland) 2007 (S.R. 2007 No. 447)
 Local Government Pension Scheme (Amendment No. 3) Regulations (Northern Ireland) 2007 (S.R. 2007 No. 448)
 Feed (Specified Undesirable Substances) Regulations (Northern Ireland) 2007 (S.R. 2007 No. 450)
 Feed (Corn Gluten Feed and Brewers Grains) (Emergency Control) (Revocation) Regulations (Northern Ireland) 2007 (S.R. 2007 No. 451)
 Administration of Estates (Rights of Surviving Spouse or Civil Partner) Order (Northern Ireland) 2007 (S.R. 2007 No. 452)
 Family Proceedings Fees (Amendment No. 2) Order (Northern Ireland) 2007 (S.R. 2007 No. 453)
 Road Traffic (2007 Order) (Commencement No. 2) Order (Northern Ireland) 2007 (S.R. 2007 No. 454)
 Motor Vehicles (Compulsory Insurance) Regulations (Northern Ireland) 2007 (S.R. 2007 No. 455)
 Occupational Pension Schemes (EEA States) Regulations (Northern Ireland) 2007 (S.R. 2007 No. 457)
 Electricity (Single Wholesale Market) (Amendment) Order (Northern Ireland) 2007 (S.R. 2007 No. 458)
 Belvedere Manor, Belfast (Abandonment) Order (Northern Ireland) 2007 (S.R. 2007 No. 459)
 Motor Vehicles (Third-Party Risks) (Amendment) Regulations (Northern Ireland) 2007 (S.R. 2007 No. 460)
 Road Transport Licensing (Fees) (Amendment) Regulations (Northern Ireland) 2007 (S.R. 2007 No. 461)
 Company and Business Names (Amendment No. 2) Regulations (Northern Ireland) 2007 (S.R. 2007 No. 462)
 B7 Chapel Hill Road, Mayobridge (Abandonment) Order (Northern Ireland) 2007 (S.R. 2007 No. 463)
 Police and Criminal Evidence (Application to Revenue and Customs) Order (Northern Ireland) 2007 (S.R. 2007 No. 464)
 Pesticides (Maximum Residue Levels in Crops, Food and Feeding Stuffs) (Amendment No. 2) Regulations (Northern Ireland) 2007 (S.R. 2007 No. 465)
 Disability Discrimination (2006 Order) (Commencement No. 4) Order (Northern Ireland) 2007 (S.R. 2007 No. 466)
 Social Security (Claims and Information) Regulations (Northern Ireland) 2007 (S.R. 2007 No. 467)
 Children (Allocation of Proceedings) (Amendment) Order (Northern Ireland) 2007 (S.R. 2007 No. 468)
 Family Homes and Domestic Violence (Allocation of Proceedings) (Amendment) Order (Northern Ireland) 2007 (S.R. 2007 No. 469)
 Disability Discrimination (Questions and Replies) Order (Northern Ireland) 2007 (S.R. 2007 No. 470)
 Fisheries (Amendment) Byelaws (Northern Ireland) 2007 (S.R. 2007 No. 471)
 Eel Fishing (Licence Duties) Regulations (Northern Ireland) 2007 (S.R. 2007 No. 472)
 Disability Discrimination (Service Providers and Public Authorities Carrying Out Functions) Regulations (Northern Ireland) 2007 (S.R. 2007 No. 473)
 Disability Discrimination (Premises) Regulations (Northern Ireland) 2007 (S.R. 2007 No. 474)
 Social Security (Housing Costs and Miscellaneous Amendments) Regulations (Northern Ireland) 2007 (S.R. 2007 No. 475)
 Police Pension (Northern Ireland) Regulations 2007 (S.R. 2007 No. 476)
 Local Government Pension Scheme (Amendment No. 4) Regulations (Northern Ireland) 2007 (S.R. 2007 No. 479)
 Motor Hackney Carriages (Belfast) (Amendment) By-Laws (Northern Ireland) 2007 (S.R. 2007 No. 480)
 Motor Vehicles (Construction and Use) (Amendment No. 4) Regulations (Northern Ireland) 2007 (S.R. 2007 No. 481)
 Official Feed and Food Controls Regulations (Northern Ireland) 2007 (S.R. 2007 No. 482)
 Plant Health (Amendment No.2) Order (Northern Ireland) 2007 (S.R. 2007 No. 483)
 Police Service of Northern Ireland Pensions (Amendment) Regulations 2007 (S.R. 2007 No. 484)
 Police Service of Northern Ireland Pensions (Amendment No. 2) Regulations 2007 (S.R. 2007 No. 485)
 Occupational Pensions (Revaluation) Order (Northern Ireland) 2007 (S.R. 2007 No. 486)
 Milk and Milk Products (Pupils in Educational Establishments) (Amendment) Regulations (Northern Ireland) 2007 (S.R. 2007 No. 490)
 Transfer of Undertakings and Service Provision Change (Protection of Employment) (Consequential Amendments etc.) Regulations (Northern Ireland) 2007 (S.R. 2007 No. 494)
 Industrial Court (Proceedings) (Amendment) Rules (Northern Ireland) 2007 (S.R. 2007 No. 495)
 Meat (Official Controls Charges) (No.2) Regulations (Northern Ireland) 2007 (S.R. 2007 No. 496)
 Fishery Products (Official Controls Charges) Regulations (Northern Ireland) 2007 (S.R. 2007 No. 497)
 Food Labelling (Declaration of Allergens) Regulations (Northern Ireland) 2007 (S.R. 2007 No. 498)
 Shrimp Fishing Nets (Amendment) Order (Northern Ireland) 2007 (S.R. 2007 No. 499)
 County Court (Amendment) Rules (Northern Ireland) 2007 (S.R. 2007 No. 500)

501-600

 Export Restrictions (Foot-and-Mouth Disease) (Revocation) Regulations (Northern Ireland) 2007 (S.R. 2007 No. 503)
 Devonshire Way and Albert Street, Belfast (Footpaths) (Abandonment) Order (Northern Ireland) 2007 (S.R. 2007 No. 504)
 Local Government (Constituting a Joint Committee a Body Corporate) (Amendment) Order (Northern Ireland) 2007 (S.R. 2007 No. 505)
 Infant Formula and Follow-on Formula Regulations (Northern Ireland) 2007 (S.R. 2007 No. 506)
 Fair Employment (Specification of Public Authorities) (Amendment) Order (Northern Ireland) 2007 (S.R. 2007 No. 507)

External links
  Statutory Rules (NI) List
 Draft Statutory Rules (NI) List

2007
Statutory rules
Northern Ireland Statutory Rules